Millgrove railway station may refer to:

 Millgrove railway station (England)
 Millgrove railway station, Melbourne